Héroes is a simple station that is part of the TransMilenio mass-transit system of Bogotá, Colombia.

Location

The station is located in northern Bogotá, specifically on the Autopista Norte with Calle 80.

It serves the Polo Club and Lago Gaitán neighborhoods, as well as the commercial area around Carrera 15 and the Zona Rosa.

History

After the Portal de Usme station was opened in early 2001, this station was added as an additional station to that line. A few months later, following the opening of Portal del Norte, this station was switched to joining that line.

The station is named Héroes due to its proximity to the Monumento a los Héroes, with which it is joined by a footpath.

The station was planned to serve as an interchange for passengers on the Calle 80 and the Autopista Norte.

On the morning of August 1, 2011, a group of vandals, apparently drunk, attacked the station point of rocks, leaving a loss of 400 thousand pesos.

Station services

Old trunk services

Main line service

Feeder routes

This station does not have connections to feeder routes.

Inter-city service

This station does not have inter-city service.

See also
List of TransMilenio Stations

TransMilenio